Shalkarteniz is a salt lake in the Yrgyz District, Aktobe Region, Kazakhstan.

It is part of the Kazakh semi-desert ecoregion. There are no towns in the immediate vicinity.

History
Until the end of the 16th century, the Shalkarteniz basin was regularly filled by the formerly more abundant waters of the Turgay river, which at that time reached the Aral Sea. In the centuries that followed the river became shallow and carried less water, so the Shalkarteniz could not overflow. Thus the Turgay stopped flowing south and the depression lost its connection with the Aral Sea. By the 20th century, at the time of the Kazakh SSR, the degradation of the forest cover and extraction of water from the Turgay and Irgiz rivers increased. Finally by 1960 Shalkarteniz completely dried up and the greater flamingo colonies stopped nesting in the place. 

However, the snowy winter of 1969-1970 filled again the rivers of the Turgay Basin, causing early and exceptionally heavy floods. Such unusual floods happened again in 1971 and 1972. As a result, the lake basin filled seasonally and the flamingos returned, establishing summer nesting colonies as before.

Geography
Shalkarteniz is an extensive seasonal lake. Arid areas surround the Shalkarteniz and to the south stretches the sandy desert of the Aral Karakum.

The lake is fed by snow. The waters of the Zhyngyldyozek, Tegene, Turgay and Irgiz rivers fill the dry basin when the snow melts in the spring, turning it into a bittern salty lake. In the summer it is usually a dry salt flat or partly swampy. 
Lakes Karakol and Kurdym lie close to the south of Shalkarteniz.

See also
Sor (geomorphology) 
List of lakes of Kazakhstan

References

External links

Shalkar-Nura -Tourism
Index maps of the geographical location of the Kazakh deposits where tapiroids remains were found

 
Endorheic lakes of Asia
Lakes of Aktobe Region